Luna County is a county located in the U.S. state of New Mexico. As of the 2010 census, the population was 25,095. Its county seat is Deming. This county abuts the Mexican border. Luna County comprises the Deming, NM Micropolitan Statistical Area.

History
Luna County was formed from parts of Grant County and Doña Ana County by the New Mexico Legislature on March 16, 1901. It was named for Solomon Luna, a politician who advocated for independence of the county, following a strong rivalry between the cities of Deming and Silver City, both of which were at the time in Grant County.

Before dawn on March 16, 1916, Mexican revolutionary Pancho Villa led several hundred of his rebel soldiers across the Mexican border into the southern county village of Columbus. The invaders raided and burned much of the town, causing many residents to flee to the desert. Although the raid completely surprised everyone in the town, it also awakened 350 United States Army soldiers at Camp Furlong at the edge of town, who defended the town with two machine guns. The fighting continued until dawn, when Villa fled back across the Mexican border, five hours after invading and approximately ninety minutes after attacking the town. Despite the U.S. Army's counter "Mexican Expedition" into Mexico, Villa was never caught; United States forces began engagement into The Great War and was unable to commit to Pancho Villas capture; he died seven years later at the hands of an assassin. Eighteen Columbus residents and U.S. soldiers were killed in the raid, while approximately seventy-five of Villa's soldiers were killed.

In 1917 striking copper miners from Bisbee, Arizona were deported to this county.

Construction of an improved barrier on the border with Mexico was expedited in 2019 with waivers of environmental and other laws. The waivers are for 27 laws including protection of endangered species, archaeological sites, and historic places.

Today, Pancho Villa State Park is located in the village of Columbus. It features beautiful cacti and the ruins of "the U.S. Army's first greaserack".

Geography
The bulk of the county is flat lowland, either grassland or desert scrub, but it also contains three mountain ranges: Cooke's Range in the north, the Florida Mountains on the southeastern side of Deming near the center of the county, and the Tres Hermanas Mountains in the southern part of the county near Columbus.

Adjacent counties and municipality
 Sierra County – northeast
 Doña Ana County – east
 Grant County – west
 Hidalgo County – west
 Ascensión, Chihuahua, Mexico – south

Major highways

Demographics

2000 census
As of the 2000 census, there were 25,016 people, 9,397 households, and 6,596 families living in the county. The population density was 8 people per square mile (3/km2). There were 11,291 housing units at an average density of 4 per square mile (1/km2). The racial makeup of the county was 74.30% White, 0.94% Black or African American, 1.11% Native American, 0.34% Asian, 20.23% from other races, and 3.08% from two or more races. 57.70% of the population were Hispanic or Latino of any race.

There were 9,397 households, out of which 33.90% had children under the age of 18 living with them, 53.60% were married couples living together, 12.40% had a female householder with no husband present, and 29.80% were non-families. 26.40% of all households were made up of individuals, and 14.00% had someone living alone who was 65 years of age or older. The average household size was 2.64 and the average family size was 3.20.

In the county, the population was spread out, with 30.00% under the age of 18, 7.60% from 18 to 24, 22.70% from 25 to 44, 21.50% from 45 to 64, and 18.20% who were 65 years of age or older. The median age was 37 years. For every 100 females there were 95.20 males. For every 100 females age 18 and over, there were 93.20 males.

The median income for a household in the county was $20,784, and the median income for a family was $24,252. Males had a median income of $25,008 versus $16,883 for females. The per capita income for the county was $11,218. About 27.20% of families and 32.90% of the population were below the poverty line, including 46.80% of those under age 18 and 15.80% of those age 65 or over.

2010 census
As of the 2010 census, there were 25,095 people, 9,593 households, and 6,484 families living in the county. The racial makeup of the county was 77.7% white, 1.3% American Indian, 1.1% black or African American, 0.5% Asian, 0.1% Pacific islander, 16.6% from other races, and 2.6% from two or more races. Those of Hispanic or Latino origin made up 61.5% of the population. In terms of ancestry, 9.7% were German, 7.4% were English, 7.3% were Irish, and 2.4% were American.

Of the 9,593 households, 34.0% had children under the age of 18 living with them, 47.6% were married couples living together, 14.5% had a female householder with no husband present, 32.4% were non-families, and 27.8% of all households were made up of individuals. The average household size was 2.56 and the average family size was 3.13. The median age was 39.5 years.

The median income for a household in the county was $27,997 and the median income for a family was $33,312. Males had a median income of $31,905 versus $19,865 for females. The per capita income for the county was $15,687. About 26.2% of families and 32.8% of the population were below the poverty line, including 50.2% of those under age 18 and 20.3% of those age 65 or over.

Education
Residents in all parts of the county are zoned to Deming Public Schools.

Communities

City
 Deming (county seat)

Village
 Columbus

Census-designated places

 City of the Sun
 Keeler Farm
 La Hacienda
 Mountain View
 Old Town
 Pecan Park
 Pulpotio Bareas
 Sunshine
 Ventura

Ghost towns
 Gage
 Mimbres
 Mowry City
 Myndus
 Nutt
 Ojo de Vaca Station

Politics

See also
 Luna, New Mexico, a community in Catron County
 National Register of Historic Places listings in Luna County, New Mexico

References

External links
 Luna County website
 Pancho Villa raid

 
1901 establishments in New Mexico Territory
Populated places established in 1901